Germán Tena Orozco (22 October 1934 – 23 December 2022) was a Mexican businessman and politician. A member of the National Action Party, he served in the Chamber of Deputies from 1985 to 1988.

Tena died on 23 December 2022, at the age of 89.

References

1934 births
2022 deaths
National Action Party (Mexico) politicians
Members of the Chamber of Deputies (Mexico)
Deputies of the LIII Legislature of Mexico
People from Morelia